This article consists of various statistical charts related to the ongoing COVID-19 pandemic in Serbia.

Cases

Total confirmed cases

New cases per day

Growth factor

Growth factor is defined as today's new cases/new cases on the previous day. It is indicative of the evolution of the pandemic. A continuously decreasing factor indicates that the pandemic is under control.

Cases by age group

Hospitalized
From June 6 until July 15, official source stopped giving number of hospitalized patients, only number of active ones From 6 June to 15 July this chart shows number of active cases.

Number of people on ventilators

Recoveries
Sudden jump in number of recoveries since 6 June was explained by changed methodology of determining healthy patients, requiring only one negative COVID-19 PCR test, as opposed to two negative test at least 24 hours apart required before.

Testing

Number of daily tests and positive cases

Total tested

Percentage of positive tests

Deaths

Total number of deaths

Number of deaths per day

Deaths by age groups

Average age of deceased on the day

By regions

Number of infected by districts and towns

(*) – include only Serbian communities in Kosovo

Number of self-isolated people by municipalities and towns

Data acquired from the official website.

Notes

References

COVID-19 pandemic in Serbia
Serbia